Pneumodesmus newmani is a species of myriapod that lived in the Paleozoic. Its exact age is uncertain; it was originally interpreted as living , in the Late Silurian; however, subsequent research dates it to around 414 million years old, in the Early Devonian (Lochkovian). It is one of the first myriapods, and among the oldest creatures to have lived on land. It was discovered in 2004, and is known from a single specimen from Stonehaven, Aberdeenshire, Scotland.

Discovery and naming
The fossil of P. newmani was found by Mike Newman, a bus driver and amateur palaeontologist from Aberdeen, in a layer of sandstone rocks on the foreshore of Cowie, near Stonehaven. The species was later given the specific epithet "newmani" in honour of Newman. The holotype is kept in National Museum of Scotland, Edinburgh. The genus name is said to derived from the Greek pneumato, meaning "air" or "breath", in reference to the inferred air-breathing habit. The proper word in ancient Greek for "air" or "breath" is however pneuma (πνεῦμα).

Description 
The single, 1 cm-long fragment of P. newmani depicts small paranota (keels) high on the body, long, slender legs. There are six body segments preserved, and the dorsal portion of each segment is ornamented with a horizontal bar and three rows of roughly hexagonal bosses (bumps). Myriapods are the group that include millipedes and centipedes, and Pneumodesmus newmani would have resembled a millipede in appearance. However it did not belong to the same branch of myriapods as modern millipedes.

Significance
The fossil is important because its cuticle contains openings which are interpreted as spiracles, part of a gas exchange system that would only work in air. This makes P. newmani the earliest documented arthropod with a tracheal system, and among the first known oxygen-breathing animal on land.

There are also trigonotarbid and arachnid fossils dating to around this time known from Lludlow in Shropshire, and together these comprise the oldest known air-breathing terrestrial animals. The earliest centipedes follow some 10 million years later, and the first known vertebrate on land, Tiktaalik, dates from 50 million years later than Pneumodesmus.

During the Silurian, the rocks that would later be part of Scotland were being laid down on the continent of Laurentia, in a tropical part of the Southern Hemisphere.

References

Silurian myriapods
Prehistoric myriapod genera
†Pneumodesmus
Paleozoic arthropods of Europe
Fossil taxa described in 2004
Fossils of Scotland
Stonehaven
History of Aberdeenshire
Collections of the National Museums of Scotland